Aranka Adriana Erzsébet Goijert (10 April 1941 – 4 January 2022) was a Dutch politician. A member of the Christian Democratic Appeal, she served in the Provincial Council of North Holland from 1991 to 2002 and in the Senate from 2007 to 2011. She died on 4 January 2022, at the age of 80.

References

1941 births
2022 deaths
Christian Democratic Appeal politicians
Members of the Provincial-Executive of North Holland
Members of the Senate (Netherlands)
People from Amsterdam